Stolen Memories: Secrets from the Rose Garden is a 1996 film made for television directed by Bob Clark starring Mary Tyler Moore. A young boy goes to visit his three aunts (Linda Lavin, Shirley Knight, and Mary Tyler Moore)

The film was released on The Family Channel on January 7, 1996 and released as well as produced by The Family Channel Network, Lavin Entertainment, and MTM Enterprises.

Plot 
After a young nephew's visit creates a woman's (Mary Tyler Moore) recollections of events that led to her mental disestablishment for the summer at their home in the south.  He becomes closest to Jessica (Moore), the childlike aunt with a troubled past, who teaches him about life and friendship.

Critical Reception

References

External links

1996 films
1996 drama films
MTM Enterprises films
The Family Channel (American TV network, founded 1990) original programming
Films directed by Bob Clark